Andreas W. Daum is a German-American historian who specializes in modern German and transatlantic history, as well as the history of knowledge and global exploration.

Daum received his Ph.D. summa cum laude in 1995 from the Ludwig Maximilian University of Munich, where he taught for six years as an assistant professor.  In 1996, he joined the German Historical Institute Washington DC as a research fellow. From 2001 to 2002, Daum was a John F. Kennedy Memorial Fellow at the Center for European Studies at Harvard University. Since 2003, he has been a professor of European history at the State University of New York (SUNY) at Buffalo.  He also served as an associate dean for undergraduate education in the provost's office. In 2010–11, he was a visiting scholar at the BMW Center for German and European Studies at Georgetown University.

He is best known as a biographer of Alexander von Humboldt and for his studies on popular science, emigrants from Nazi Germany, and the United States’ special relationship with "America’s Berlin".  His book Kennedy in Berlin highlights the role of emotions in the Cold War and provides a comprehensive explanation of John F. Kennedy's 1963 "Ich bin ein Berliner" speech.

In 2019, he was awarded the Humboldt Prize, a lifetime achievement award for international scientists and scholars, and invited to spend the year 2019–20 at the University of Munich. He has received fellowships and grants from the Alexander von Humboldt Foundation, American Philosophical Society, National Endowment for the Humanities, Smithsonian Institution, Gerda Henkel Foundation, DAAD, and the Studienstiftung des Deutschen Volkes.

Books
 Wissenschaftspopularisierung im 19. Jahrhundert: Bürgerliche Kultur, naturwissenschaftliche Bildung und die deutsche Öffentlichkeit, 1848‒1914, Munich: Oldenbourg (1998; 2nd edition 2002), a study on science popularization in the 19th century 
 Kennedy in Berlin, New York: Cambridge University Press (2007, German edition 2003)
 Alexander von Humboldt, Munich: C. H. Beck (2019)

Edited Volumes

 America, the Vietnam War and the World: Comparative and International Perspectives, with Lloyd C. Gardner and Wilfried Mausbach, New York: Cambridge University Press (2003)
 Berlin ‒ Washington, 1800‒2000: Capital Cities, Cultural Representations, and National Identities, with Christof Mauch, New York: Cambridge University Press (2005, paperback 2011)
 The Second Generation: Émigrés from Nazi Germany as Historians. With a Biobibliographic Guide, with Hartmut Lehmann and James J. Sheehan, New York: Berghahn Books (2016, paperback 2018)

External links
 Faculty member, Department of History, University at Buffalo
 John F. Kennedy Memorial Fellow at the Center for European Studies, Harvard University
 Visiting Scholar at the BMW Center for German and European Studies, Georgetown University
 Recipient of the Baird Society Resident Scholarship from the Smithsonian Institution 
 “UB historian says lessons for COVID-19 found in work of 19th-century scientist Humboldt”
 Interview with Andreas Daum (2019), "The sensual Humboldt is yet to be discovered", Alexander von Humboldt Foundation 
 Andreas W. Daum,  “Ich bin ein Bürger: Das Bekenntnis des amerikanischen Präsidenten Kennedy zu Berlin”, Frankfurter Allgemeine Zeitung, no. 143, June 24, 2013

References 

Living people
Historians of Germany
Historians of Europe
Historians of science
20th-century German historians
21st-century American historians
American male non-fiction writers
University at Buffalo faculty
German emigrants to the United States
German male non-fiction writers
Alexander von Humboldt
John F. Kennedy
Year of birth missing (living people)
21st-century American male writers